Anand may refer to:

People
 Anand (name), a surname and given name (including a list of people with the name)
 Anand (actor), Indian actor
 Anand (Maoist), Indian communist
 Anand (writer) (born 1936), Indian Malayalam writer

Places
 Anand, Gujarat, India, a city
 Anand railway station
 Anand district, Gujarat, India
 Anand (Lok Sabha constituency), Gujarat, India
 Anand (Vidhan Sabha constituency), Gujarat, India
 Anand, Iran, a village

Outer space
 23323 Anand, a main belt asteroid
 9 Andromedae, variable star designation AN And

Films
 Anand (1971 film), a Hindi-language film starring Rajesh Khanna and Amitabh Bachchan
 Anand (1986 film), a Kannada-language film starring Shivarajkumar
 Anand (1987 film), a Tamil-language film starring Prabhu Ganeshan
 Anand (2004 film), a Telugu-language film starring Raja and Kamalinee Mukherjee

Other uses
 Anand Agricultural University, Gujarat, India
 Anand Vihar Terminal railway station, in Anand Vihar, Delhi, India